Ozeka is a hamlet and council located in the municipality of Aiara, in Álava province, Basque Country, Spain. As of 2021, it has a population of 14.

Geography 
Oceca is located 51km northwest of Vitoria-Gasteiz.

References

Populated places in Álava